Local elections were held in Cebu on May 9, 2016, as part of the 2016 Philippine general election. Voters selected from among candidates for all local positions: a town mayor, vice mayor and town councilors, as well as members of the Sangguniang Panlalawigan, the vice-governor, governor and representatives for the seven districts of Cebu (including two districts of Cebu City and the lone district of Lapu-Lapu City).

Gubernatorial and Vice Gubernatorial race

Governor
Incumbent Governor Hilario Davide III is running for a second term. His opponent is former Government Service Insurance System President Winston Garcia.

Vice Governor
Davide's running mate is incumbent Vice Governor Agnes Magpale while Garcia's running mate is former 6th District Representative Nerissa Corazon Soon-Ruiz.

Congressional race

1st District
Samsam Gullas is the incumbent.

2nd District
Wilfredo Caminero is the incumbent.

3rd District
Gwendolyn Garcia is the incumbent.

4th District
Benhur Salimbangon is the incumbent.

5th District
Joseph Ace Durano is not running, his brother Ramon Durano VI is the party's nominee.

6th District
Gabriel Luis Quisumbing is running for Mayor of Mandaue City, Incumbent mayor Jonas Cortes is the party's nominee.

7th District
Pablo John Garcia will run for the newly created 7th District against Board Member Peter John Calderon. If he wins he will join his sister Gwendolyn in the House of Representatives respectively.

Cebu City

1st District
Raul del Mar is the incumbent.

2nd District
Rodrigo Abellanosa is the incumbent.

Lapu-Lapu City
Aileen Radaza is the incumbent.

Sangguniang Panlalawigan

1st District

2nd District

3rd District

4th District

5th District

6th District

7th District

City and Municipality elections

1st District, Mayoral Elections

Carcar

Naga City

Talisay City

Minglanilla

San Fernando

Sibonga

2nd District, Mayoral Elections

Alcoy

Argao

Boljoon

Dalaguete

Oslob

Samboan

Santander

3rd District, Mayoral Elections

Toledo City

Aloguinsan

Asturias

Balamban

Barili

Pinamungajan

Tuburan

4th District, Mayoral Elections

Bogo

Bantayan

Daanbantayan

Madridejos

Medellin

San Remigio

232

Santa Fe

Tabogon

Tabuelan

5th District, Mayoral Elections

Danao

Borbon

Carmen

Catmon

Compostela

Liloan

Pilar

Poro

San Francisco

Sogod

Tudela

6th District, Mayoral Elections

Mandaue City

Consolacion

Cordova

7th District, Mayoral Elections

Alcantara

Alegria

Badian

Dumanjug

Ginatilan

Malabuyoc

Moalboal

Ronda

Cebu City, Mayoral Elections

Lapu-Lapu City, Mayoral Elections

Lapu-Lapu City Local Candidates

Vice Mayor 
 YCONG, MARCIAL (LP)

Councilor 
 AMIT, LEOPOLDO (NPC)
 AMODIA, EMOT (NPC)
 AMORES, RICARDO (LP)
 AMORIN, AVELINA (UNA)
 AYING, TINO (PDPLBN)
 BAGUIO, MEMIE (NPC)
 BERDIN, ELIAS (LP)
 BERING, RUFO (PDPLBN)
 CABAHUG, JOHN (IND)
 CODILLA, JOHN NORMAN (UNA)
 COSEP, BONNIE (IND)
 CUENCA, BOB (IND)
 DELA SERNA, JV (PDPLBN)
 DESTAJO, ELENO (UNA)
 DICO, REYMAR (IND)
 DIGNOS-VIDAL, MELISSA (LP)
 DIMATAGA, FRANCISCO II (IND)
 DUNGOG, FERDINAND (PDPLBN)
 FLORES, CIPRIANO (LP)
 GABAYAN, NELSON (UNA)
 GALA, ROGELIO (UNA)
 GILIG, ISKO (PDPLBN)
 GODORNES, ALEX DAVE (PDPLBN)
 GOMEZ, DAMIAN JR (LP)
 GUIGAYUMA, MALINIS (UNA)
 HAMBUNAN, MOISES (NPC)
 HIYAS, FLAVIANO JR (LP)
 ILUSTRISIMO, NOEL (UNA)
 IMBONG, MARIA FE (PDPLBN)
 INOT, FREDIE (UNA)
 JUMAO-AS, THELMA (NPC)
 LAPERA, FELIX (UNA)
 LUMONGSOD, CLYDE (UNA)
 MARIGOMEN, MARIO (NPC)
 MATA, NEFE (NPC)
 MERCADO, LEO (LP)
 PAQUIBOT, GREGORIO JR (LP)
 PATALINJUG, BOY (LP)
 PONCE, FLORITA (UNA)
 RADAZA, HARRY (LP)
 RAMIREZ, RONEL (IND)
 SABALONES, TANTAN (PDPLBN)
 SAURO, WILMA (NPC)
 SILAWAN, CESARIO (PDPLBN)
 SOMBILON, JEMBO (NPC)
 TAN, EDWARD (UNA)
 TUMULAK, ERNESTO (PDPLBN)
 VERAME, FRED (NPC)
 VERGA, CONNIE (NPC)
 WAGWAG, ROQUE (LP)
 WASLO, MELVIN (NPC)
 YAP, NELSON (LP)

References

2016 Philippine local elections
Elections in Cebu